Bedoin may refer to:
           
Bédoin, a commune in Vaucluse, France
Bedouin, a predominantly desert-dwelling Arab ethnic group